Ballycullane is a small village located in the south-west of County Wexford, in Ireland. As of the 2016 census, it had a population of 318 people.

Transport
Ballycullane Railway Station opened on 1 August 1906. In its final years the rail service consisted of a solitary train in each direction between Rosslare Europort and Waterford. The rail service ceased after the passage of the evening train on Saturday 18 September 2010. Bus Éireann route 373 serves Ballycullane on Tuesdays only.

Amenities
Today, the village contains a shop, pub, national (primary) school, and a Garda station. and also

The village also contains a Roman Catholic church and an adjoining cemetery. This church was built in 1840, and was extensively renovated in 1970, giving it a more modern appearance. Ballycullane is part of the parish of Tintern.

See also
 List of towns and villages in Ireland

References 

Towns and villages in County Wexford